Moulin Rouge, the French term for "Red Mill", is a famous Paris cabaret.

Moulin Rouge may also refer to:

Art, entertainment and media

Films
 Moulin Rouge (1928 film), directed by Ewald André Dupont
 Moulin Rouge (1934 film), directed by Sidney Lanfield
 Moulin Rouge (1952 film), directed by John Huston
 Moulin Rouge!, 2001 film directed by Baz Luhrmann

Theater 

 Moulin Rouge! (musical), 2018 musical

Literature
 Moulin Rouge, a novel by Pierre La Mure and the basis for the 1952 film

Music
 Moulin Rouge (band), a Slovenian popular music group
 "It's April Again", also known as "The Song from Moulin Rouge" or "Moulin Rouge" or "Where Is Your Heart", from the 1952 film Moulin Rouge
 Moulin Rouge! Music from Baz Luhrmann's Film, soundtrack to the 2001 film
 Moulin Rouge! Music from Baz Luhrmann's Film, Vol. 2, volume two of the soundtrack of the 2001 film

Periodicals
 Moulin rouge (magazine), a Russian magazine

Visual art
 At the Moulin Rouge, a painting by Henri de Toulouse-Lautrec

Enterprises
 Moulin Rouge Hotel, a hotel in Las Vegas, Nevada
 Moulin Rouge Cinema, a movie theater in Tehran

See also

 
 Rouge (disambiguation)
 Moulin (disambiguation)